The 1968 Summer Paralympics were the third Paralympic Games to be held. Organised under the guidance of the International Stoke Mandeville Games Federation (ISMGF), they were known as the 17th International Stoke Mandeville Games at the time. The games were originally planned to be held alongside the 1968 Summer Olympics in Mexico City, but in 1966, the Mexican government decided against it due to difficulties. The Israeli government offered to host the games in Tel Aviv, a suggestion that was accepted.

The opening ceremony took place in the Hebrew University stadium at the Givat Ram campus in Jerusalem and the games took place in Ramat Gan, Tel Aviv District, at the Israel Sports Center for the Disabled. The closing ceremony took place in the Tel Aviv Trade Center. Therefore, these games were the first in Paralympic history to not be held concurrently with the Olympic Games.

Sports 

Lawn bowls was included in the program for the first time. In wheelchair basketball, a women's team event was added, as was a 100 m wheelchair race for men in athletics.

 Archery
 Dart archery
 Athletics
 Lawn bowls
 Snooker
 Swimming
 Table tennis
 Weightlifting
 Wheelchair basketball
 Wheelchair fencing

Medal table 

The top ten listed NOCs by number of gold medals are listed below. The host nation, Israel, is highlighted.

Participating delegations 
Twenty-eight delegations took part in the Tel Aviv Paralympics. Canada, Denmark, Ethiopia, India, Jamaica, New Zealand, South Korea and Spain took part in the Summer Paralympics for the first time.

Having made its Paralympic Games début four years earlier, South Africa continued to compete at the Paralympics, by sending a delegation to the Tel Aviv Games. It was, at the time, banned from the Olympic Games due to its policy of apartheid, but it was not banned from the Paralympics until 1980 Summer Paralympics in Arnhem.

References 

 
Paralympics
Paralympics
Multi-sport events in Israel
Paralympic Games
Paralympic Games
Paralympics, 1968 Summer
Summer Paralympic Games
November 1968 sports events in Asia
1960s in Tel Aviv
Parasports in Israel